Thenipatti is a small town in Tamil Nadu, India. It comes under the jurisdiction of the T. Pudupatti police station of the Thirumayam taluka. Thenipatti is called Kilanilai for Government registers two panchayat office is formed and services  Kaikulanvayal and  Karamangalam

References 
Local guide Thenipatti 

Villages in Pudukkottai district
It has a petrol pung